Nakausap Ko ang Birhen is a 1988 Filipino religious drama film directed by Mike Relon Makiling, written by Makiling and Tony Mortel, and starring Lotlot de Leon, Ramon Christopher, Eddie Garcia, Janice de Belen, Snooky Serna, Barbara Perez, Sarsi Emmanuelle, and Marissa Delgado. Produced by Regal Films for the Lenten season, it was released on March 24, 1988. Critic Luciano E. Soriano of the Manila Standard gave the film a negative review, criticizing its superficial qualities and spotty writing which prevented the film from having spiritual depth.

Cast

Lotlot de Leon as Milagros
Ramon Christopher as Nestor
Eddie Garcia as Apiong, Milagros' father
Janice de Belen as Julia, a crippled non-believer
Snooky Serna as the Virgin Mary
Barbara Perez as the mother superior
Sarsi Emmanuelle
Marissa Delgado as Merlie, Milagros' mother
Subas Herrero as Don Ricardo
Bella Flores as Sister Rafaelita
Ramil Rodriguez
Alicia Alonzo
Nanding Fernandez
Vicky Suba
Vangie Labalan
Alma Lerma
Marilyn Villamayor
Mike Austria
Melissa Silvano
Manolette Ripoll
Arlan Israel
Maila Marcelo
Andro Guevarra
Paul Pereyrra
Patricia Javier
Harvey Vizcarra
Bert Mansueto
Bamba
Atong

Release
Nakausap Ko ang Birhen was rated "B" by the Movie and Television Review and Classification Board (MTRCB), indicating a "Good" quality, and was released on March 24, 1988.

Critical response
Luciano E. Soriano of the Manila Standard gave Nakausap Ko ang Birhen a negative review. Though he appreciated that a major studio like Regal Films made an effort to produce a religious film for the Lenten season, he criticized the film's shallow approach to its profound story, and cited among others a "facile" storyline involving Christopher's character Nestor entering the seminary after breaking up with Milagros. Soriano also criticized the inconsistencies in the film's screenplay, highlighting lapses in logic such as Nestor not being jailed for committing arson to Milagros' parents' whorehouse. In addition, Soriano was critical of Garcia and Flores' caricature-like exaggerated performances which undermined the seriousness that the film is striving for. Soriano concluded that with its superficial qualities, "[i]ts objective is clearly material and not spiritual."

References

External links

1988 films
1988 drama films
Filipino-language films
Films about Catholicism
Marian apparitions in film
Portrayals of the Virgin Mary in film
Religious drama films
Films directed by Mike Relon Makiling